

557001–557100 

|-id=045
| 557045 Nadolschi || || Victor Nadolschi (1911–1996) was a Romanian astronomer || 
|}

557101–557200 

|-bgcolor=#f2f2f2
| colspan=4 align=center | 
|}

557201–557300 

|-bgcolor=#f2f2f2
| colspan=4 align=center | 
|}

557301–557400 

|-bgcolor=#f2f2f2
| colspan=4 align=center | 
|}

557401–557500 

|-bgcolor=#f2f2f2
| colspan=4 align=center | 
|}

557501–557600 

|-bgcolor=#f2f2f2
| colspan=4 align=center | 
|}

557601–557700 

|-bgcolor=#f2f2f2
| colspan=4 align=center | 
|}

557701–557800 

|-bgcolor=#f2f2f2
| colspan=4 align=center | 
|}

557801–557900 

|-bgcolor=#f2f2f2
| colspan=4 align=center | 
|}

557901–558000 

|-bgcolor=#f2f2f2
| colspan=4 align=center | 
|}

References 

557001-558000